Site 132, also known as Chusovaya , is a launch complex at the Plesetsk Cosmodrome (in the Soviet Union, then in Russia), used by Kosmos launch vehicles. It consists of two launch pads: Site 132/1 (2010), and 132/2 (1990), which are inactive.

The first launch from Site 132/1 was conducted on either 15 May or 26 June 1967, followed by the first known launch from Site 132/2 on 26 June 1967. The last launch from Site 132/2 occurred on 25 April 1990. Both pads were used by the same two rockets, the Kosmos-3 and Kosmos-3M. Although most Kosmos-3M launches have been conducted from Site 132, several early tests were conducted from Site 131; however, it is not known which ones, or how many. Some launches were also conducted from Site 133.

References 

 
 
 

Plesetsk Cosmodrome